Tristan Flore (born 2 January 1995 in Montélimar) is a French table tennis player. He competed at the 2016 Summer Olympics as part of the French team in the men's team event.

References

1995 births
Living people
French male table tennis players
Olympic table tennis players of France
Table tennis players at the 2016 Summer Olympics
Universiade medalists in table tennis
Universiade bronze medalists for France
Table tennis players at the 2019 European Games
European Games medalists in table tennis
European Games bronze medalists for France
Medalists at the 2015 Summer Universiade
People from Montélimar
Sportspeople from Drôme
21st-century French people